Orient was launched in 1814 at Calcutta. She sailed to England and from then on was based there. She traded with India into the 1830s. She participated in a naval punitive expedition in 1819, and performed four voyages for the British East India Company. From the 1840s she continued to sail widely until she was condemned in 1865 and sold for breaking up.

Career

Early career
Shortly after her launch Orient sailed to England. She first appeared in Lloyd's Register in 1815 with W. Rutter, master, Js. Murry, owner, and trade London–Bengal.

From 1814 the EIC lost its monopoly on the trade between Britain and India. Orient then traded with India under a license from the EIC. For instance, on 17 March 1817 Captain R. Cook sailed for Bengal.

Punitive expedition
Eighteen transports, most merchant vessels registered at Bombay, carried troops and supplies. One of the transports was Orient. 

After destroying Ras al-Khaima, the British then spent the rest of December and early January moving up and down the coast destroying forts and vessels. The capture and destruction of the fortifications and ships in the port was a massive blow for the Gulf pirates. British casualties were minimal.

Then on 3 April 1821 Captain P. Wallace sailed Orient to Madras.

EIC voyages
The EIC chartered Orient four times, each time for a single voyage.

EIC voyage #1 (1823–1824)
On 22 April 1822, the EIC accepted a tender from Orients owner for a voyage at a rate of £10 15s per chartered ton. Captain Thomas White sailed from Portsmouth on 26 May 1823, bound for Bengal and Madras. Orient reached Simon's Bay on 14 August and arrived at Diamond Harbour on 30 October. She was Calcutta on 18 November. Homeward bound, she was at Diamond Harbour again on 3 January 1824. She was at Madras on 17 January and Point de Galle on 11 February. She reached St Helena on 19 April and arrived at The Downs on 18 June.

EIC voyage #2 (1825–1826)
The EIC accepted a tender of £14 7s per chartered ton for one voyage to China and Quebec. Captain White sailed from Portsmouth on 3 July 1825, bound for China and Quebec. She reached Penang on 13 November and arrived at Whampoa anchorage on 30 January 1826. Homeward bound, she crossed the Second Bar on 10 March, and reached on St Helena on 4 July. She arrived at Quebec on 4 September and returned to her mornings on 20 November.

EIC voyage #3 (1831–1832) 
The EIC on 29 April 1831 chartered Orient for a voyage to and from Bengal at a rate of £7 19s d per ton. Captain White sailed from Portsmouth on 12 July 1831, bound for Bengal. Orient reached the Cape of Good Hope on 13 September and arrived at Calcutta on 29 November. Homeward bound, she was at Kedgeree on 14 February 1832, was at the Cape on 20 April, reached St Helena on 7 May, and arrived at The Downs on 22 June.

EIC voyage #4 (1833–1834)
The EIC on 1 May 1833 chartered Orient for a voyage to and from Bengal at a rate of £8 13s 6d per ton. Captain White sailed from Portsmouth on 18 June 1833, bound for Madras and Bengal. Orient reached Madras on 4 November and arrived at Calcutta on 19 December. Homeward bound, she was at Saugor on 6 February 1834 and Madras again on 24 February, reached St Helena on 28 May, and arrived at The Downs on 20 July.

Later career
The data below comes from Lloyd's Register, which was only as accurate as shipowners chose to keep it. 

Between 1839 and 1841 Orient carried emigrants to Australia. Captain Douglas Wales sailed from England on 6 April 1839 with passengers and some 300 emigrants for Australia.

Fate
Orient, having been condemned after survey, was sold for breaking up.

Citations and references
Citations

References
 
 
  
 . (Scott).

1814 ships
British ships built in India
Age of Sail merchant ships of England
Ships of the British East India Company